The 2013 Irish Greyhound Derby took place during August and September with the final being held at Shelbourne Park in Dublin on 14 September 2013.

The winner Slippery Robert won €120,000 and was trained by Robert Gleeson, owned and bred by Larry Dunne. The race was sponsored by the UK-based independent finance company Enterprise Target Solutions (ETS).

Final result 
At Shelbourne, 14 September (over 550 yards):

Distances 
1¾, 1¾, 3¾, ½ (lengths)

Competition Report
Defending champion Skywalker Puma, Ballymac Vic, Droopys Jet and recent Champions Stakes winner Paradise Madison were the leading contenders for the 2013 Irish Derby. The English threat came in the form of Holdem Spy. A mandatory first round acted as a trial because only 16 from 120 would be eliminated which was lucky for Ballymac Vic who could only finish fifth but still qualified.

In round two only Paradise Madison, Kereight King and Tyrur Sugar Ray remained unbeaten. Skywalker Puma who had impressed in the first round finished badly lame and was withdrawn. Kereight King posted the best third round time and became the new favourite but all the major names also progressed. The event was set for very competitive quarter finals but suffered a double blow before they started. The English hope Holdem Spy had suffered a hock injury when winning previously and Ballymac Vic gashed his foot at his home kennels.

The first three quarter finals were won by Cabra Buck, Hawaii Kinsale and Isabels Boy win the first three heats, Droopys Jet was eliminated but Ballymac Vic qualified but ran under par with his patched up foot. The fourth heat contained Kereight King, Paradise Madison, Ringtown Snowy and Tyrur Sugar Ray and it was Kereight King confirming his favourite tag who won the race. Tyrur Sugar Ray ran well again to finish second but Paradise Madison and Ringtown Snowy failed to progress. Pat Curtin's Kereight King was now clear favourite.

The semi-final were as expected, Tyrur Sugar Ray won the weaker heat from Slippery Robert and Carrowgarriff and Cabra Buck continued his good run defeating Kereight King and Ballymac Vic. After the draw for the final it was revealed that Kereight King had broken a toe and Ballymac Vic had split his foot again. It meant a five dog final and Ballymac Vic would not be at his best.

If the unnecessary first round had been cancelled it would have been likely that both Kereight King and Ballymac Vic could have competed in the final at their best. The five runner race saw Slippery Robert gain victory after taking the lead at the third bend from Cabra Buck. The under par Ballymac Vic held up the gambled Tyrur Sugar Ray at the first bend ending his chances.

Quarter finals

Semi finals

See also
2013 UK & Ireland Greyhound Racing Year

References

Greyhound Derby
Irish Greyhound Derby
Irish Greyhound Derby
Irish Greyhound Derby, 2013